is a passenger railway station located in the city of Tokorozawa, Saitama, Japan, operated by the private railway operator Seibu Railway.

Lines
Kōkū-kōen Station is served by the Seibu Shinjuku Line between Seibu Shinjuku Station in Tokyo and Hon-Kawagoe Station in Kawagoe, and is located 30.5 km from the Seibu Shinjuku terminus. All trains except Koedo limited express and Commuter express services stop at this station.

Station layout
Kōkū-kōen Station has two entrances, east and west, with the ticket vending on the third level.

The exterior of the whole three-storied station building is designed to look like a "Henri Farman" biplane, 1910's Farman III, which is the first official powered aircraft in Japan, the clock, above the entrance, as its propeller, and was selected as one of the top 100 Train Stations of the Kantō region by MLIT in 1998.

Several stores, such as Henri Farman Bakery & Cafe, Hōrindō Book store, and Senba21 Supermarket, are located in the station building.

Platforms
The station consists of two side platforms serving two tracks. Platform 1 is for trains heading towards Hon-Kawagoe Station and platform 2 is for trains heading towards Seibu Shinjuku Station.

History
The station opened on 28 May 1987.

Station numbering was introduced on all Seibu Railway lines during fiscal 2012, with Kōkū-kōen Station becoming "SS23".

Passenger statistics
In fiscal 2019, the station was the 46th busiest on the Seibu network with an average of 24,494 passengers daily.

The passenger figures for previous years are as shown below.

Surrounding area

To the east of the station is:
 Tokorozawa Aviation Museum and Tokorozawa Aviation Memorial Park
 YS-11 (Retired aircraft on display)
 Tokorozawa City Hall (local government office building)
 Tokorozawa Central Post Office
 Tokorozawa Police Station
 Tokorozawa Public Employment Security Office
 Tokorozawa Labor Standards Inspection Office
 Tokorozawa District Public Prosecutor's office
 Tokorozawa Tax office
 Saitama District Legal Affairs Bureau, Tokorozawa Branch
 Tokorozawa City Library
 National Defense Medical College
 National Rehabilitation Center for Persons with Disabilities (NRCD)
 Environmental Investigation Laboratory
 Child Guidance Clinic
 TEPCO Tokyo Office
 Tokyo Aeronautical Traffic Control Center
 Tokorozawa Summary Court
 Tokorozawa Civic Cultural Centre Muse (concert hall complex)

To the west of the station is:
 Tokorozawa Public Health Center
 Tokorozawa City Water Works Office
 Tokorozawa City Fire Department
 Heartia Tokorozawa (cultural hall, in Moto-machi, opened in spring 2010)
 Tokorozawa Shimmei-sha Shrine

See also
 List of railway stations in Japan

References

External links

 Station information (Seibu Railway) 

Railway stations in Japan opened in 1987
Railway stations in Tokorozawa, Saitama
Seibu Shinjuku Line